Apáthy is a surname. Notable people with the surname include:
 
Stephan Apáthy (1863–1922), Hungarian zoologist and histologist 
Jenő Apáthy (1883–1959), Hungarian fencer

Hungarian-language surnames